Michael (Mick) William Cusack is an Irish former international racing cyclist, author and speaker.  He competed as a member of the Irish national cycle racing team.

Background 
Born in London, England, Cusack acquired Irish citizenship from his father, John Cusack, who was born and raised in Westport, County Mayo, Ireland. The family moved to Dublin, Ireland in 1964 and he was subsequently educated at Drimnagh CBS (beside Drimnagh Castle) and Templeogue College, before joining Irish Shipping as a personnel assistant in 1973.

Cycling career
Cusack began his cycling career in 1973 with the Dublin Wheelers Cycling Club. In 1974, he finished second in the Junior race at the Irish National Cycling Championships and represented Ireland at the Isle of Man Cycling Week. Later that year, he joined the Tailteann racing team managed by John Lackey and was named to the Irish Olympic Squad for the 1976 Summer Olympics, along with Kelly, Peter Morton, Alan McCormack, John Shortt, and Tony Lally. He rode his first amateur Tour of Ireland in the same year, finishing 39th in the eight-day race won by McQuaid. In 1976, he won his first senior road race, the Skerries Gran Prix near Dublin. Also in 1976, he and teammate Morton were invited to race in the United States and Canada by the Raleigh-sponsored Century Road Club of America on a squad that included John Howard (cyclist) and John Allis. Cusack finished third in the Criterium de Montreal, Canada before returning to Ireland. An accident in Wicklow while riding home from the Sean Dillon Memorial Race that same year knocked him out of international competition, including the Olympics, for almost eighteen months.

Cusack returned to racing in 1978, and won the Longford Two-Day race, following which he was named to the Irish team for the inaugural Tour of Europe, where he finished 36th after five days of racing from Reims through the Vosges Mountains to the finish in Strasbourg. On his return from Europe, he won several domestic races and represented Ireland along with Stephen Roche in the Tour of Ireland, where he finished third in the final stage outside Dublin. Cusack was then named to the initial Irish Olympic Squad for the 1980 Summer Olympics, along with Roche, Bernard McCormack, John Shortt and Alan McCormack, but did not compete there. His last major race was the Shay Elliott Memorial Race in 1979, which was won by Morton in a snowstorm. He retired from international events to focus on a copywriting career, although he later raced in the United States for the Somerset Wheelmen and High Gear Cyclery road racing teams. On April 24, 2022, he returned to racing by finishing fifth in the 65+ age category at a 125-kilometres Gran Fondo World Championship qualifying event near Morbisch Am See, Austria "UCI Gran Fondo World Series Qualified Riders Neusiedlersee Radmarathon". This result qualified him to represent Ireland at the 2022 Gran Fondo World Championships held in Trento, Italy on September 18, 2022, an event at which he finished in 28th place in the 65-69 age category after 88 kilometres of racing and over 2,300 metres of climbing, including the ascent of Monte Bodoni "2022 Gran Fondo World Championship Rankings".

Major results 
2nd Irish National Junior Road Race Championship (1974)
3rd Douglas Gran Prix, Douglas, Isle of Man (1974)
1st Skerries Gran Prix, Dublin, Ireland (1975)
1st Dublin-Longford Two-Day (1978)
4th Irish National Senior Road Race Championships (1978)
9th Tour of the Cotswolds International Star Trophy Race (1978)
1st Carrick-on-Suir Gran Prix (1978)
1st Tour of Clondalkin (1978)
1st Mullingar Road Race (1978)
3rd Tour of Ireland, Stage 8 Dublin, Ireland (1978)
5th Gran Fondo World Championship Qualifier 65+ Age Category Morbisch Am See, Austria (2022)

Professional career
As a copywriter, Cusack won "Best Newcomer to Irish Advertising" at the Irish Advertising Awards Festival (IAAF) in 1980. After living in Vienna, Austria, he spent two years working in Khamis Mushayt, Saudi Arabia before travelling throughout India, Nepal, China, Mongolia and Russia. He emigrated to the United States in 1985 and studied creative writing at New England College, New Hampshire, under the guidance of Joel Oppenheimer. Following his marriage and honeymoon spent climbing Kilimanjaro and visiting Victoria Falls in 1987, he moved to New Jersey, where he acquired a Master of Arts degree in Corporate and Organizational Communications from Fairleigh Dickinson University. He returned to Nepal on two subsequent occasions, once riding from Kathmandu to Tibet. His two sons, Sean and Brendan Cusack, were born during his appointment as a consultant for the AT&T Artificial Intelligence group and Bell Laboratories. In 1992, he was a delegate to the Conference on Artificial Intelligence in Sydney. His subsequent effort to scale the highest point on the continent, Mount Kosciuszko, on cross-country skis was thwarted by a blizzard. He was the keynote speaker at Contact Centre World 2001 in Singapore.

Publications
The American Society for Quality published his first book, "Online Customer Care", in 1998, and he subsequently penned "Behind the Yellow Jersey - Racing in the Shadows of Kelly and Roche" (Hardcover 2022), which describes his final season at international level. His business books include "Conducting a Contact Center Assessment" (2013) and "Customer Service 2020 - Assessing Your Contact Center" (2018). He also wrote "We Wished for the Cloths of Heaven" (2021).

He published "Croagh Patrick and the Islands of Clew Bay - A Guide to the Edge of Europe", which he presented publicly in July 2017 in a lecture entitled Beautiful Clew Bay.

References

1955 births
Living people
Irish male cyclists
Dublin Wheelers cyclists
Cyclists from Greater London